Vishudhan is a 2013 Indian Malayalam-language crime drama film Written and Directed by Vysakh and starring Kunchacko Boban and Miya. The film tells the story of a Catholic Christian priest and a nun. It was released on 22 November 2013.

The film was shot at Thodupuzha and nearby locations.

Plot
Sunny, a young priest, is put in charge of a church in a rural area. The church runs an old age home which is sponsored by Vavachan. Sunny meets Sister Sophie and discovers the motives behind Vavachan's philanthropy,  he gets the unclaimed dead bodies for the medical college run by his son. Sunny meets Annie Mol, the daughter of the church grave digger, who aspires to follow in the footsteps of Mother Teresa. Sunny offers to get an admission in a nursing college in Bangalore. Annie Mol witnesses an elderly woman smothered to death by Vavachan's son. She confesses to Sophie and Sunny, who advises her to reveal it to the police. But afraid for her life and her father, Annie Mol, refuses and prepares to leave for Bangalore.

Sunny learns many members of the home are not Christians, but accommodated by Vavachan, so he can get their cadavers. Sunny decides to reveal everything to the Bishop. Vavachan begins a smear campaign against Sunny and Sister Sophie that gets the sister thrown out of the church on the charge of having an affair with Sunny. Sunny leaves the priesthood to be her protector. They get married and eventually come back to prove that they have not done anything wrong. They face the ridicule of the village but Pokkiriyachan comes to their rescue. He helps Sunny get a job at a resort playing in a band while Sophie becomes pregnant. Annie Mol becomes a prostitute to get money. Sunny encounters Annie Mol with a stranger and realises her decision. Confronting Annie Mol, she explains that she had no other way.

Her father confesses to Sunny that Annie Mol was caught in a raid and after realising that her father knew, she committed suicide and then he does too. Sunny decides to give the evidence to the Bishop, but is intercepted by the police, who wants to question him on the deaths of Annie Mol and her father. Sophie says that Annie Mol witnessed the murder committed by Vavachan's son and gives the copy of the evidence to the Inspector who reveals it to Vavachan.

Pokkiriyachan gets Sunny out on bail, Sunny confesses all what he knows to Pokkiriyachan. Sunny finds Sophie shot dead by Vavachan and his son. He hunts down Vavachan's son and kills him by brutally smashing his face. He then kills Vavachan and realises that Vavachan's grandson has witnessed the murder. The grandson prays and he breaks down and embraces the boy

Cast

Soundtrack
The songs of the film are composed by Gopi Sunder with lyrics penned by  Rafeeq Ahmed, Murugan Kattakada.

Reception
Ajin Krishna of Oneindia.in gave a rating of 3 out of 5 and said it is one of the best till date from Vyshakh. The Times of India also gave 3 out of 5 rating and commented that the film has an unpretentious, lasting effect that comes out of certain sequences crafted with genuine moments so familiar to mankind. Rajeevan Francis of Metro Matinee commented that Vishudhan is a feel good movie, peppered with moral questionings, romance and conflict, the movie makes for a relaxed viewing, that is pleasant and not too emotionally daunting.  Indiaglitz.com said that Vishudhan has a bold theme and will appeal to more serious viewers than the supporters of masala flicks.

References

External links
 

2013 films
Indian romantic musical films
Films directed by Vysakh
Films scored by Gopi Sundar